Yafran  (Berber: ⵢⴼⵔⴰⵏ Ifran), also spelled Jefren, Yefren, Yifran, Yifrin or Ifrane, is a city in northwestern Libya, in the Jabal al Gharbi District in the western Nafusa Mountains. Before 2007, Yafran was the administrative seat of the Yafran District.

Libyan civil war

Yafran people, as in other cities of Libya, have demonstrated against Gaddafi. Subsequently, Yafran was exposed to bombardment and siege by Gaddafi forces. As of May 2011, Gaddafi's forces had shut down the water system and blocked food supplies and held the western part of the town with some 500 rebels in the eastern section of Yafran still resisting.

Yafran fell to Gaddafi's forces sometime in late May or early June. The centre of the town was used as a position for "government tanks, artillery guns and snipers". On 2 June, rebel forces retook the city center and started to clear the area of Gaddafi's forces.
On 6 June, an on-site Reuters journalist reported that the pro-Gaddafi forces were nowhere to be seen in or around the town.

See also
 List of cities in Libya

Notes

External links
 "Yafran, Libya", Falling Rain Genomics, Inc.
 "Yafran Map — Satellite Images of Yafran", Maplandia

Populated places in Jabal al Gharbi District
Tripolitania
Baladiyat of Libya